Trigilia is an Italian surname. Notable people with the surname include: 

Carlo Trigilia (born 1951), Italian academic and politician
Loredana Trigilia (born 1976), Italian wheelchair fencer

Italian-language surnames